Corny Casanovas is a 1952 short subject directed by Jules White starring American slapstick comedy team The Three Stooges (Moe Howard, Larry Fine and Shemp Howard). It is the 139th entry in the series released by Columbia Pictures starring the comedians, who released 190 shorts for the studio between 1934 and 1959.

Plot
The Stooges are happily cleaning the house, as they dream about getting married in a few hours. The usual antics occur as the boys make a near shambles of their home.

For starters, Shemp decides to use the wooden handle of a loaded pistol as a hammer, which of course goes off, and parts Moe's sugarbowl haircut right down the middle. Then the trio try to reupholster a davenport, but end up clobbering Moe on several counts. First, they cut the upholstering with a scissor and end up trimming Moe's sport coat. Then, to speed things up, they pour the upholstering tacks into a machine gun and aim at the davenport. The rapid fire release works well at first, but Larry and Shemp argue over who gets the next round, leading the rifle firing directly at Moe's gluteus maximus. After Larry and Shemp quickly remove the tacks, Moe manages to swallow one. After all is said and done, the house is neat and clean.

The Stooges then head their separate ways to marry their sweetheart — unaware they are all engaged to the same girl, Mabel (Connie Cezon). In rapid succession, Larry, Moe, and then Shemp appear at Mabel's home with engagement rings of varying sizes. When the boys discover their error, a nutty fight ensues. The three eventually, knock each other cold, and Mabel quickly scurries by them with three engagement rings.

Production notes
Corny Casanovas was filmed on December 3–5, 1951. It was remade with Joe Besser in 1957 as Rusty Romeos, using ample recycled footage. A mild variation of the Stooges' theme song "Three Blind Mice" was used for this film. This version would be used throughout 1952.

Director Jules White was known for including many violent jokes revolving around the buttocks. Many other Columbia directors felt this type of humor was crass, and often shied away from it. However, White felt this was the trademark of the Stooges' mayhem. Nothing was too crass or exaggerated to be taken seriously.

Memorable quotes
Larry: "The tacks won't come out!"
Shemp: "They went in. Maybe they're income tacks!"

References

External links 
 
 
Corny Casanovas at threestooges.net

1952 films
1952 comedy films
The Three Stooges films
American black-and-white films
Films directed by Jules White
Columbia Pictures short films
American comedy short films
1950s English-language films
1950s American films